André Apaid, Jr. is a  businessman in Haiti known for leading the Group of 184, a coalition which forced Jean-Bertrand Aristide from power in 2004 through a coup d'état in collaboration with the United States. According to Guy Philippe, Apaid and other businessmen financed and met with Philippe and other leaders of the paramilitaries which took up arms to overthrow Aristide. Apaid is the head of Alpha Industries, one of the largest assembly factories in Haiti, as well as a member of both Initiative de la Société Civile and Fondation Nouvelle Haiti.

References

 "Who's Who in the Haiti Regime"
 U.S. Rep. Maxine Waters condemns violence in Haiti 11 February 2004.
 Thomas M. Griffin. Center for the Study of Human Rights, Miami School of Law. Haiti Human Rights Investigation 11–21 November 2004.
 Andréa Schmidt and Anthony Fenton. Znet. "Andy Apaid and Us" 19 October 2005. (Contains reference to the Griffin article.)

Living people
Haitian people of Lebanese descent
Year of birth missing (living people)